Acorn moth can refer to either of two small moths whose caterpillar larvae feed on acorns:

 Blastobasis glandulella, a Blastobasidae moth from North America
 Cydia splendana (chestnut tortrix), a tortrix moth from Europe

Animal common name disambiguation pages